San Joaquin Light and Power Corporation Building is an historic 11-story,  high-rise in downtown Fresno, California. The building was completed in 1923 for the San Joaquin Light and Power Corporation, that later became the Pacific Gas and Electric Company, by chief designer Raymond R. Shaw of the R.F. Felchlin Company.  The building is the fourth tallest in the city.

References

External links

San Joaquin Light & Power Corporation Building (1924) at the Historic Fresno website

Buildings and structures in Fresno, California
Office buildings on the National Register of Historic Places in California
Commercial buildings completed in 1923
National Register of Historic Places in Fresno County, California
Beaux-Arts architecture in California
Skyscraper office buildings in California
Skyscrapers in Fresno, California